This article lists the largest companies in Canada in terms of their revenue, net profit and total assets, according to the American business magazines Fortune and Forbes.

2019 Fortune list 
This list displays all 13 Canadian companies in the Fortune Global 500, which ranks the world's largest companies by annual revenue. The figures below are given in millions of US dollars and are for the fiscal year 2018. Also listed are the headquarters location, net profit, number of employees worldwide and industry sector of each company.

2019 Forbes list 

This list is based on the Forbes Global 2000, which ranks the world's 2,000 largest publicly traded companies. The Forbes list takes into account a multitude of factors, including the revenue, net profit, total assets and market value of each company; each factor is given a weighted rank in terms of importance when considering the overall ranking. The location of each company's headquarters and its industry sector are also listed in the table below.The figures are in billions of US dollars and are for the year 2018. All 56 companies from Canada are listed.

See also 
 List of companies of Canada
 List of largest public companies in Canada by profit
 List of largest companies by revenue
 List of the largest trading partners of Canada

References 

Canda

Economy of Canada